Michel Zevaco (also written as Zévaco) (1 February 1860, Ajaccio - 8 August 1918, Eaubonne) was a French journalist, novelist, publisher, film director, and anti-clerical as well as anarchist activist.

Michel Zevaco founded the anarchist weekly magazine Gueux (French, Beggars) on 27 March 1892. A month later he was jailed for 6 months and fined for praising Pini and Ravachol. Afterwards he wrote for Sébastien Faure's journal, Libertaire, as well as for the anarchist newspaper La Renaissance. In 1898, he edited l'Anticlérical, for the Anticlerical League of France and was involved in supporting Alfred Dreyfus during the eponymous Dreyfus Affair.

Zevaco's famous cloak and dagger novels, Les Pardaillan, began to be serialized in the daily newspapers in 1900 to great popular success. Yet he is today quite unknown, in spite of the new interest aroused by popular literature.

A former school teacher, then an officer, he became a militant journalist, who wrote for various revolutionary newspapers, of anarchist tendency. He became famous mainly for the part he played in the anti-clerical struggles at the end of the 19th century. Then, as a writer of serial novels, he published works which had a great success in Jean Jaurès' daily La Petite République, and he became appointed serial writer for Le Matin from 1906 to his death.

His already well-established popularity was made even greater by his promising beginnings as a film-director in 1917. His novels first published by Fayard and Tallandier were republished several times and adapted for the screen; the latest paperback edition only gives a mutilated version, and is impaired by many cuts.

He is remembered as the author of Les Pardaillan, Le Capitan, Le Pont des soupirs (Bridge of Sighs), Borgia, Buridan, L'Héroïne, l'Hôtel Saint Pol and Nostradamus, his most famous historical novels, but also published novels related to his times. Some of his serials have not yet been published.

Zevaco's novels, including the Les Pardaillan series, were translated into Persian as part of the great interest in historical novels in Iran. The publisher was Gutenberg Publishers, a joint project of the famous Soviet Mir Publishing House and an Iranian publisher. Following the success of the translations of the novels of Alexandre Dumas in Iran, many translators sought similar novels to translate. Among these were Zabihollah Mansouri  and Manuchehr Motiei, the latter even attempting to write similar novels set in an Iranian environment. Among the novels translated were the Les Pardaillan, Fausta the Female Pope, Nostradamus, Buridan, and many other works of Zevaco. In Persian, due to a mistake, his name sometimes is written as Z-W-A-G-O which can be read as Zewago or Zouago and has caused problems. 
Leader of Iran Ayatollah Khamenei has also read some novels of Zevaco and recommended them to the youths : I do not want to introduce too many books and novels to the youths, but I may name some authors. For instance, there is a well-known French author called Michel Zevaco who has written many books. I have read most of his novels in the past.

In the 1960s, many of Zevaco's historical novels were translated to Hebrew and published with considerable success by the M. Mizrahi (מ. מזרחי) publishing house in Tel Aviv מ. מזרחי. The 1963 translation of Le Capitan was by Yehoshua Kenaz, a well-known Israeli writer. However, these Hebrew translations are long out of print, and Zevaco is virtually unknown to later generations of Hebrew readers.

Zevaco is well known in Turkey; his most important books have been translated and published in Turkish. Borgia was translated in 1909 into Ottoman language, and printed by Hilal Matbaası. The Les Pardaillan series have appeared in many different editions, printed by Şems Matbaası in 1910s, by İNKILAP VE AKA in 1940s, by GÜVEN BASIM VE YAYINEVİ in 1940s, 1950s and 1960s, by Baskan and Oluş in 1970s. There are two new translations after 2000.

Adaptations
Several of his novels have been adapted for film and television.
 Il ponte dei sospiri (1921, dir. Domenico Gaido)
 Buridan, le héros de la tour de Nesle (1923, dir. Pierre Marodon)
 Triboulet (1923, dir. Febo Mari)
 Nostradamus (1937, dir. Juan Bustillo Oro and Antonio Helú)
 Il ponte dei sospiri (1940, dir. Mario Bonnard)
 Le Capitan (1946, dir. Robert Vernay)
 Buridan, héros de la Tour de Nesle (1952, dir. Émile Couzinet)
 Sul ponte dei sospiri (1953, dir. Antonio Leonviola)
 Le Capitan (1960, dir. André Hunebelle)
  (1962, dir. Bernard Borderie)
 Hardi Pardaillan! (1964, dir. Bernard Borderie)
 The Avenger of Venice (1964, dir. Carlo Campogalliani and Piero Pierotti)

References

External links 
 
 
 Michel Zévaco - Bibliographie complète at Roman-Feuilleton & HARD-BOILED site (Comprehensive Bibliographies by Vladimir Matuschenko)
 List and covers of the Hebrew translations of Zevaco's books

1860 births
1918 deaths
Writers from Ajaccio
19th-century French novelists
20th-century French novelists
French journalists
French anarchists
French historical novelists
French newspaper founders
French male novelists
19th-century French male writers
20th-century French male writers
French male non-fiction writers